John Kendall Cowne (born May 23, 1962 in Fairfax, Virginia) is a former American football center, primarily a long snapper on special teams.  He attended Brentsville District High School and played college football at Virginia Tech in the early 1980s.

Cowne briefly made it to the National Football League with the Washington Redskins.  He was on the team's roster in 1987, playing weeks four to six as one of the replacement players hired during the National Football League Players Association strike that year.  Due to the playoff success of the Redskins after rosters were restored, Cowne and other replacement players received bonus checks for their contributions towards the Redskins win.  Cowne was only the third Hokie to play for the Redskins when signed in 1987.  He had previously gone to training camp for the 1987 season with the San Diego Chargers before being waived at the end of preseason.

Cowne is currently employed by Loudoun County Public Schools, working at C.S. Monroe Technology Center. In addition to teaching, Cowne is a football coach at Woodgrove High School in Purcellville, Virginia. In 2011, his NFL jersey was added to the "Coaches Corner" wall of fame, a popular restaurant in Purcellville Virginia.

In March of 2018, he received a Super Bowl ring  at a ceremony in Redskins Park.

References

1962 births
Living people
Sportspeople from Fairfax County, Virginia
American football centers
Virginia Tech Hokies football players
Washington Redskins players
American football long snappers
People from Purcellville, Virginia
National Football League replacement players